A Hole in the Wall is a 1982 Argentine film directed by David José Kohon.

It is loosely inspired in Faust and fictionalizes the era of the Argentine dictatorship.

Cast 
  Alfredo Alcón
  Mario Alarcón
  María Noel
  Walter Santa Ana
  Virginia Romay
  David Tonelli
  Juan Carlos Chávez
  Ingrid Pelicori
  Manuel Callau
  Luis Linares
  Oscar Roy

References

External links

Argentine comedy-drama films
1982 films
1980s Spanish-language films
1982 comedy-drama films
Films directed by David José Kohon
National Reorganization Process
1980s Argentine films